Evercreech is a village and civil parish  south east of Shepton Mallet, and  north east of Castle Cary, in the Mendip district of Somerset, England. The parish includes the hamlet of Stoney Stratton and the village of Chesterblade.

History

The village was recorded as Evrecriz in the Domesday Book of 1086.

The parish was part of the hundred of Wells Forum.

Governance

The parish council has responsibility for local issues, including setting an annual precept (local rate) to cover the council's operating costs and producing annual accounts for public scrutiny. The parish council evaluates local planning applications and works with the local police, district council officers, and neighbourhood watch groups on matters of crime, security, and traffic. The parish council's role also includes initiating projects for the maintenance and repair of parish facilities, as well as consulting with the district council on the maintenance, repair, and improvement of highways, drainage, footpaths, public transport, and street cleaning. Conservation matters (including trees and listed buildings) and environmental issues are also the responsibility of the council.

The village falls within the Non-metropolitan district of Mendip, which was formed on 1 April 1974 under the Local Government Act 1972, having previously been part of Shepton Mallet Rural District. The district council is responsible for local planning and building control, local roads, council housing, environmental health, markets and fairs, refuse collection and recycling, cemeteries and crematoria, leisure services, parks, and tourism.

Somerset County Council is responsible for running the largest and most expensive local services such as education, social services, libraries, main roads, public transport, policing and fire services, trading standards, waste disposal and strategic planning.

The village falls in 'Creech' electoral ward. The area and population of this ward are stated above.

It is also part of the Somerton & Frome county constituency represented in the House of Commons of the Parliament of the United Kingdom. It elects one Member of Parliament (MP) by the first past the post system of election, and was part of the South West England constituency of the European Parliament prior to Britain leaving the European Union in January 2020. This constituency elected seven MEPs using the d'Hondt method of party-list proportional representation.

Landmarks

There are two pubs in the village: The Bell Inn and the Pickled Inn (formerly The Shapway Inn). The Pecking Mill is within a very short distance to the south. Historically, one of the local pubs, The Brewers Arms, celebrated New Year's Eve with fireworks,  but on New Years Day 2005 it announced that it had closed forever. Rumours were rife around the reasons for the closure (most likely due to the non-profitability of such a local enterprise) - popularly noting that the real estate value of the site was extremely high.

Cutterne Mill is an old watermill. which is now being used for electricity generation as part of the South Somerset Hydropower Group

The market cross dates from the 15th century. In the 19th century the cruciform head was restored. It is a Grade II* listed building and has been scheduled as an ancient monument.

Industry
Historic industries in Evercreech include quarrying of blue lias and clay; brick making; milk processing; and agriculture, which remains the leading industry today. From the late 18th century until just after World War I, silk processing was an important industry for Evercreech, a spillover from mills at nearby Bruton and Sherborne. The workforce for the village's three silk factories was made up almost entirely of young women and girls, some of whom started working as young as seven or eight years of age. Fulfilling orders from London, two of the factories were throwing mills which produced high quality spun silk thread. The third mill wove silk thread into cloth. Bales of raw silk were imported to the mills from France, Italy, and India by London merchants. Employment in the mills was erratic, driven by highly volatile demand for English woven silk. This volatility was caused by embargoes on imported woven silk, duty taxes, and then the lifting of import restrictions in 1860.

Transport

Evercreech Junction was a railway station on the Somerset and Dorset Joint Railway. It was replaced by Evercreech New railway station from 1874 to 1966, when it closed. Nowadays, the nearest railway stations to Evercreech are in Bruton and Castle Cary.

Religious sites

The Church of St Peter dates from the 14th century and is a Grade I listed building. The three-stage tower has set-back buttresses ascending to pinnacles, with a very tall transomed two-light bell-chamber with windows on each face The embattled parapet has quatrefoil piercing, with big corner pinnacles and smaller intermediate pinnacles. The four-light west window has extensively restored tracery. This tower is of the East Mendip type. On the north wall of the tower is a roll of honour to victims of World War I. It is within a rectangular wooden case with a glazed door crowned by a triangular pediment and plaque below.

The church's clock is unusual in that it is missing the 10th hour number, usually shown as the Roman numeral 'X'. The Roman numeral at the 10th hour position is XI (11) and it is followed by the Roman numeral for twelve (XII). Thus the numbers of the last quarter read IX (9) - XI (11) - XII (12) - XII (12). Local rumour suggests that the person who paid for the clock to be made, was instructed by his wife that he had to be home from the pub by 10 o'clock. Therefore, he ensured that the 10 o'clock numeral (X) was missing.

The sounds of the bells at Evercreech church were used in the opening credits of BBC's Songs of Praise for many years. There were many complaints.

At Chesterblade the tiny Church of St Mary dates from the 12th century.

References

External links

Evercreech village website

Villages in Mendip District
Civil parishes in Somerset